Hypercallia bruneri is a moth in the family Depressariidae. It was described by August Busck in 1934. It is found in Cuba.

References

Moths described in 1934
Hypercallia